William Demotte is a French professional rugby union player with Grenoble in the Pro D2 League. His favoured position is second-row, and he has the immense size required to play in such a position (202 cm tall and 124 kg in weight). He is seen as a great prospect for the future of French rugby.

References

1991 births
Living people
French rugby union players
SU Agen Lot-et-Garonne players
Stade Rochelais players
FC Grenoble players
France international rugby union players
Rugby union locks